Joel David Williams (born March 16, 1965) is a former American football tight end who played one season with the Miami Dolphins of the National Football League (NFL). He was drafted by the Miami Dolphins in the eighth round of the 1987 NFL Draft. He played college football at the University of Notre Dame and attended Gateway High School in Monroeville, Pennsylvania.

References

External links
Just Sports Stats

Living people
1965 births
Players of American football from Pittsburgh
American football tight ends
African-American players of American football
Notre Dame Fighting Irish football players
Miami Dolphins players
21st-century African-American people
20th-century African-American sportspeople